Cristián Ariel Morales Yáñez (born September 25, 1972 in Santa Fe, Argentina) is a former Argentine footballer who played for clubs of Argentina, Chile and Mexico.

Irapuato 
Cristián Ariel Morales is considered to be one of the best Players from Irapuato FC, he won 2 championships with the team and won the promotion to the first division of Mexico. he is compared to Irapuato's current captain and Argentinian striker Ariel González.

Honors 
Irapuato (2)
 Primera Division A –  Invierno 99, Verano 2000

Cobreloa (2)
 Primera División –  Apertura 2003, Clausura 2003

Individual 
 Top goalscorer of the tournament: (2) 
 Primera Division A –  Invierno 98, Invierno 99

External links
 
 Profile at En una Baldosa 
 Profile at Futbol XXI 

1972 births
Living people
Argentine footballers
Argentine expatriate footballers
Rosario Central footballers
Atlético Tucumán footballers
Talleres de Remedios de Escalada footballers
Irapuato F.C. footballers
C.D. Veracruz footballers
Cobreloa footballers
Chilean Primera División players
Argentine Primera División players
Liga MX players
Expatriate footballers in Chile
Expatriate footballers in Mexico
Argentino de Rosario footballers
Association football forwards
Footballers from Santa Fe, Argentina